(born January 3, 1974) is a Japanese softball player who played as a Center Field. She won the silver medal in the 2000 Summer Olympics.

References

Japanese softball players
Living people
Softball players at the 2000 Summer Olympics
Olympic softball players of Japan
Olympic silver medalists for Japan
1974 births
Olympic medalists in softball
Medalists at the 2000 Summer Olympics
20th-century Japanese women
21st-century Japanese women